The 1997 season was Djurgårdens IF's 97th in existence, their 4th season in Division 1 Norra and their 2nd consecutive season in the league. They were competing in Allsvenskan and 1997–98 Svenska Cupen.

Player statistics
Appearances for competitive matches only.

|}

Goals

Total

Division 1 Norra

Svenska Cupen

Allsvenskan play-offs

Competitions

Overall

Division 1 Norra

League table

Matches

Allsvenskan play-offs

Svenska Cupen

Friendlies

Notes

References

Djurgårdens IF Fotboll seasons
Djurgarden